Field is a surname. Notable people with the surname include:

Alexander Field (disambiguation), several people of that name
Amod Field (born 1967), American football player
Andy Field (academic) (born 1973), professor of psychology at the University of Sussex
Andy Field (blogger) (born 1983), British theatremaker, blogger, curator and academic
Anthony Field (born 1963), Australian musician
Charles Field (disambiguation), several people of that name
Cyrus West Field (1819–1892), American businessman and financier, responsible for the first Transatlantic Cable
David Field (disambiguation), several people of that name
Dick Field, right wing Canadian politician
Edwin Field (1872–1947), English rugby and cricket player
Edwin Wilkins Field (1804–1871), English lawyer and painter
E. J. Field, British neuroscientist
Ernie Field (1943–2013), English boxer and rugby league player
Eugene Field (1850–1895), American poet
Francis Field (disambiguation), several people of that name
Frank Field (disambiguation), several people of that name
Frederick Field (disambiguation), several people of that name
Hamilton Easter Field (1873-1922), artist, art patron, and critic
Hartry Field (born 1946), philosopher at New York University
James Field (disambiguation), several people of that name
Jimmy Field (born 1940), Louisiana politician
John Field (disambiguation), several people of that name
Joshua Field (disambiguation), several people of that name
Judith V. Field (born 1943), British historian of mathematics and art
Marshall Field (disambiguation), several people of that name
Martha Field (born 1943), academic and court clerk
Martha R. Field (1856–1898), American newspaper reporter
Mary Field (1909-1996), American actress
Matt Field, British diplomat
Michael Field (disambiguation), several people of that name
Michel Field (born 1954), French journalist
Nathan Field, (1587–1620), English dramatist and actor
Noel Field, central character of several show trials in Eastern Europe during the 1950s
Osmond F. Field, American college sports coach
Oscar Wadsworth Field, American Medal of Honor recipient
Richard Field (disambiguation), several people of that name
Roger Field (disambiguation), several people of that name  
Roswell Field (1807–1869), American lawyer, politician
Sally Field, American actress
Sam Field (1848–1904), American baseball player
Sam Field (born 1998), English footballer
Sid Field (1904–1950), English comedian
Stephen Field (disambiguation), several people of that name
Syd Field (1935–2013), American screenwriting guru
Sylvia Field, American actress
Thomas Field (disambiguation), several people of that name
Tommy Field (born 1987), American baseball shortstop
Todd Field, American film director
The Field (musician), Axel Willner, a Swedish electronic musician
William Field (disambiguation), several people of that name

See also
Fields (surname)
Feild

English-language surnames